Shuyang is a county in northern Jiangsu province. It is under the administration of the prefecture-level city of Suqian. Shuyang sits on the Northern Jiangsu Plains and borders the cities of Xuzhou, Lianyungang and Huai'an to the north, east and south.

Shuyang is a pilot administrative division for "provinces governing county level units directly" in Jiangsu, along with Kunshan and Taixing.

Etymology
The name of “Shuyang” was first officially used in 549 AD during Eastern Wei.

The two Chinese characters in the county's name are “沭” and “阳”, together meaning “in the north of the Shuhe River”. As the government and commercial center, the county seat was chosen to be constructed in the north of Shuhe River in 549 AD in order to control the land around the river basin.

History

Prior to its proclamation as Zhou Dynasty in 1111 BC, the area around northern of Jiangsu was inhabited by the Dongyi, an ancient ethnic established numerous city-states. The area around Shuyang belonged to one of Dongyi states called ‘Tan (郯)’.

In the late period of Zhou Dynasty, that is Spring and Autumn period, the State of Lu began to expand its power to the south. Part of the region was officially proclaimed as the territory of the State of Lu in 582 BC after the fortress, ‘Zhongcheng (中城)’, was built on the northwest. This is also the first city in this place in accordance with ‘The Spring and Autumn Annals’ which compiled by Confucius. In the Warring States period, the Chu conquered and controlled the land of this area.

After Qin's wars of unification, the Qin Dynasty was established by Qin Shi Huang, the first emperor of China. ‘Houqiu County’ was founded for administrating the region and the governments of later dynasties generally follow this pattern.

In 549 AD, the imperial government of Eastern Wei abandoned the old castle and city wall and moved the local government into a new county seat near the north of Shuhe River. In the meantime, the county was changed to the present name, Shuyang County. In later 1400 years, the location of the county seat keep constant.

As the main natural disaster in the northern Jiangsu, rain storms and floods are the principle threat to the county in old days. The castle and city wall of Shuyang was totally destroyed up to the middle of the 15th century. The government rebuilt the city wall until 1512 and was ruined by the floods subsequently. In 1594, the local government started to rebuild a substantial one with a plenty of bricks and stones and finished in 1616.

In early modern period, the life in this region are recognised as peaceful and stable for most of the time. However, the life in modern years was full of challenges and crises. The biggest crisis was the Japanese invasion in 1937. The city wall and many ancient architecture were devastated at the beginning of the war.

Geography
Shuyang is on the North China Plain, approximately 260 kilometers to Nanjing, and 450 kilometers to the center of Shanghai. The county stretches 60 kilometers from east to west, and 55 kilometers from north to south.

Shuyang is located in a low-lying plain with an average elevation of merely 4.5 to 7 meters above sea level. Hanshan Hill is east of the county in Hanshan Town at an elevation of 70 meters above sea level. It is the tallest point of the whole region.

Climate
Shuyang has a distinct four-seasons, monsoon-influenced humid subtropical climate with hot, humid summers, and generally mild, dry winters (Köppen climate classification Cfa).

Winters are generally mild and dry, however, cold northwesterly winds from Mongolia-Siberia can cause temperatures to drop below freezing in the night, although there is an occasional snowfall in winters in recently years. Summers are hot and humid, southeasterly winds during the summer can push temperatures above 35 °C. In midsummer, occasional downpours, or thunderstorms can be expected.

Administrative divisions

Subdistricts
The metropolitan area is divided to 6 subdistricts:

 Shucheng
 Mengxi
 Nanhu
 Zhangji
 Qixiong
 Shizi

Towns
There are 25 towns:

 Longji
 Huji
 Qianji
 Tanggou
 Machang
 Yishou
 Miaotou
 Hanshan
 Huachong
 Sangxu
 Yuelai
 Liuji
 Lihuan
 Zhaxia
 Yanji
 Tongyang
 Longmiao
 Gaoxu
 Gengxu
 Tangjian
 Xinhe
 Xianguan
 Wuji
 Hudong
 Qingyihu

Townships
There are 8 townships:

 Beidingji
 Zhouji
 Dongshaodian
 Zhangwei
 Maowei
 Xiwei
 Wanpi
 Guandun

Demography
Shuyang is the most populated county in Jiangsu with a population of 1.93 million. It is also considered to be one of the most populated counties in China. Shuyang had a metropolitan population of more than 560,000 refer to 2010 census, making it a midsize city. Major areas of population growth in recent years were in suburbs like Nanhu and Mengxi where now a part of the metropolitan area. In 2015, the urban area will have a population of approximately 800,000. Some 30% of the population of the whole region are residents of the metropolitan area, making Shuyang a thriving city in the north of Jiangsu.

Economy
In the period of Republic of China, the economy in Shuyang had collapsed due to the Japanese invasion and frequent floods. In the 1950s, the economy developed rapidly benefit from the recovery and further development of agriculture and industry in the region. However, Shuyang formed decreasingly important in the economy of the Jiangsu Province from the time of Cultural Revolution. Compared with the cities in the southern part of Jiangsu, the local governments held a conservative and pedantic opinion on the economy. In 1997, the Qiu He Government began its ambitious reformations. The economic portion of the reform mainly focused on the industrialization and privatization and it works. There is a dramatically development in the industrial sector as it attracts a plenty of investment. The economic success makes Shuyang top 100 the most developed counties in China .

Culture

Dialect
There are over 1.7 million people in Shuyang speak a subdialect of Lower Yangtze Mandarin, called Haisi Dialect. Like most of Lower Yangtze Mandarin, Haisi dialect has five tones due to the preservation of the entering tone (rù sheng 入声) of Middle Chinese, more than four toned Standard Chinese which lost the entering tone
.
The dialect of Haisi has largely lost initial n, replacing it with l, and the retention of entering tone set it apart from other mandarin dialects.

The speaker of the dialect could easily understand other mandarins, not vice versa. As the Standard Chinese (Putonghua) forms increasingly powerful in social life, it has largely impacted on the dialect in words, pronunciation, and grammar.

Religions
Freedom of religion makes people of all religions live in harmony. However, approximately 95% of the population expressed no religious affiliation in accordance with 2010 Census although Shuyang attaches a wide variety of holy turf.

Buddhism
It has been unverified when the Buddhism was firstly introduced to Shuyang. It might be introduced to this region around the 2nd century to the 3rd century by sea. The oldest temple in Shuyang is the Qingliang Temple which was built before 9th century refer to records.

Christianity
In 1921, Presbyterian Church in the United States started their missionary work in Shuyang. The current church was built on 1993 in the north of the urban area. The second church will be opened in 2014.

Intangible Cultural Heritage

National level
Huaihai opera

Infrastructure

Transport

Road 
G2 Beijing–Shanghai Expressway
China National Highway 205

Railway
The Xinyi-Changxing Railway, a significant transport service provider in Shuyang, connects the city with other places on the national railway network. The railway is the bridge connects the Longhai and Jiaoxins in the north and with the Nanjing-Nantong, Beijing-Shanghai, Xuancheng-Hangzhou Railways in the south. Shuyang railway station, near the metropolitan area, is a third class station on the Xinyi-Changxing Railway.

Water transport
The Lianyungang-Suqian Canal connects the Lianyungang Port and the Grand Canal is under construction

Sister cities 
 Domestic
 Kunshan, Jiangsu
 Yiwu, Zhejiang
 Jinggangshan, Jiangxi
 Dongxiang County, Jiangxi

References 

 
Cities in Jiangsu
Populated places established in the 6th century BC
County-level divisions of Jiangsu